Seymour Weiss (May 15, 1925 – September 23, 1992) was an American diplomat and a high-ranking official at the United States Department of State.

Biography
Seymour Weiss was born in Chicago on May 15, 1925. He served in the United States Navy during World War II, achieving the rank of Lieutenant. After the war, he attended the University of Pennsylvania, and then received a Master of International Affairs degree from the University of Chicago.

Weiss then spent five years working in the Office of Management and Budget and the United States Agency for International Development. Weiss then joined the United States Foreign Service.

From 1968 to 1969, Weiss headed the State Department's Office of Strategic Research and Intelligence. He spent 1972-73 as deputy director of the Policy Planning Staff.

In 1973, President of the United States Richard Nixon nominated Weiss as Director of the Bureau of Politico-Military Affairs; he held this office from August 6, 1973 until January 17, 1974.

President Gerald Ford appointed Weiss United States Ambassador to the Bahamas in 1974, and Weiss held this post, his last, from September 11, 1974 until December 15, 1976.

In retirement, Weiss continued to act as an adviser on foreign policy and defense affairs. In the late 1970s, was an advisor to Team B. During the 1980 presidential election, he was a foreign policy advisor for Ronald Reagan, and during the Reagan administration, he would serve as an advisor to United States Secretaries of Defense Caspar Weinberger (1981–87) and Frank Carlucci, and under the administration of George H. W. Bush as an advisor to Defense Secretary Dick Cheney. Weiss was generally considered a neoconservative, a hawk, and an anti-Soviet hard-liner.

Weiss died of liver cancer at his home in Bethesda, Maryland, on September 23, 1992, at the age of 67.

References
Bruce Lambert, "Seymour Weiss, Long an Adviser On Military Policy, Is Dead at 67", New York Times, Sept. 25, 1992
Overview of Papers at Online Archive of California

1925 births
1992 deaths
American diplomats
United States Foreign Service personnel
American anti-communists
United States Navy personnel of World War II
University of Pennsylvania alumni
University of Chicago alumni
American expatriates in the Bahamas
Conservatism in the United States